The Zonggo Formation is a geological formation in Tibet whose strata date back to the Late Cretaceous. Dinosaur remains are among the fossils that have been recovered from the formation.

Vertebrate paleofauna
 Ornithomimus sp
 Megacervixosaurus tibetensis

See also

 List of dinosaur-bearing rock formations

References

Upper Cretaceous Series of Asia